The Mercedes-Benz O370 is a bus made in Brazil in the 1980s. The O370RS model was fitted with an OM355/6A engine, the O370RSD model with an OM355/6LA engine and the O370R on an OM355/5A engine. The RS model has only one axle in the back, but the RSD has two axles in the back side, and the axle that moves the vehicle is the last one; the other only supports weight. The RS and the RSD model has pneumatic suspension, but the R model has springs suspension. This model has the same aspect as the Mercedes-Benz O371.

O370